Morten Skaug is a Norwegian curler and curling coach.

Teams

Record as a coach of national teams

References

External links

 Video: 

Living people
Norwegian male curlers
Norwegian curling coaches
Year of birth missing (living people)
20th-century Norwegian people